Louis Osborne Coxe (April 15, 1918 – May 25, 1993) was an American poet, playwright, essayist, and professor who was recognized by the Academy of American Poets for his "long, powerful, quiet accomplishment, largely unrecognized, in lyric poetry." He was probably best known for his dramatic adaptation of Herman Melville's Billy Budd, which opened on Broadway in 1951.

Early life and education 
Born in Manchester, New Hampshire in 1918 but raised in Salem, Massachusetts (where his family had lived since 1640), Coxe was educated at St. Paul's School. He graduated from Princeton University in 1940, writing his senior thesis on Edwin Arlington Robinson.

Career 
During World War II, Coxe served in the United States Navy, commanding the U.S.S. PC-549 in the South Pacific Theater during the Northern Solomon Islands campaign and the invasion of Guam and invasion of Saipan-Tinian (and later the U.S.S. PC-1195), an experience that would shape much of his poetry. After leaving active service in 1946, he married Edith Winsor, granddaughter of Boston financier Robert Winsor, and began teaching at Princeton. He was Briggs-Copeland Fellow at Harvard University from 1948 to 1949, and from 1949 to 1955, he taught at the University of Minnesota. Coxe then moved to Bowdoin College in Brunswick, Maine in 1956, where he remained (except for brief appointments at Trinity College, Dublin, Ireland, and the University of Aix-Marseilles, France) as head of the English department until his death in 1993 after 11 years suffering from Alzheimer's disease.

Recognition 
Coxe received his largest critical recognition for his dramatic adaptation, with Robert Chapman, of Herman Melville's morality tale Billy Budd, which opened to critical acclaim on Broadway in 1951, winning both the Donaldson Awards and the Outer Critics Circle Award for best play. The New York Times' Brooks Atkinson called it "extraordinarily well done," and said that "the tragic portions are written with taste, firmness and intelligence." Coxe was also credited with co-writing the screenplay for Peter Ustinov's film version of the play. He wrote several other plays, most for local productions in Maine, one of which, "Decoration Day" (about Civil War general Joshua Lawrence Chamberlain), was published as a book along with his long narrative poem "Nikal Seyn." He was also praised for his criticism, writing books on both Chaucer and Edwin Arlington Robinson.

But Coxe's main focus was his poetry, which U.S. Poet Laureate Howard Nemerov called "terse, cryptic, almost savage in their beauty." Much of his work focused on his experience during World War II and the natural environment of his native New England. Several of his poems, reviews and essays appeared first in The New Yorker, The New Republic, Paris Review, and Atlantic Monthly. In 1972 the Maine State Commission on the Arts and Humanities presented him with a Maine State Award for his significant contributions to the cultural life of Maine. He was named the 36th fellow of the Academy of American Poets in 1977 and was awarded a creative writing grant from the National Endowment for the Arts that same year. One of the last poems he published, "Nightsong" (1983), was featured in the anthology Fifty Years of American Poetry.

Bibliography

Poetry 
 The Sea Faring and Other Poems (1947)
 The Second Man and Other Poems (1955)
 The Wilderness and Other Poems (1958)
 The Middle Passage (1960)
 The Last Hero and Other Poems (1965)
 Nikal Seyn & Decoration Day: A Poem and a Play (1966)
 Passage: Selected Poems 1943–1978 (1979)
 The North Well (1985)

Plays 
 Billy Budd (1949)
 Nikal Seyn & Decoration Day: A Poem and a Play (1966)
 Birth of a State

Criticism 
 Chaucer, part of the Laurel Poetry Series (editor, along with introduction and notes) (1963)
 Edwin Arlington Robinson; The Life of Poetry (1969)
 Enabling Acts: Selected Essays in Criticism (1976)

Awards 
 Donaldson Awards Best Play, 1951
 Outer Critics Circle Award Best Play, 1951
 Maine State Award, 1972
 National Endowment for the Arts creative writing grant, 1977
 Academy of American Poets Fellowship, 1977

References

External links 
 Louis O. Coxe, 75; His Poems Reflected New England Roots, by Marvine Howe. New York Times, May 28, 1993.
 Obituary: Louis Osborne Coxe. Saint Paul's School Alumni Horae Autumn 1993, Volume 73, Issue 3, Page 223.

1918 births
1993 deaths
Writers from Manchester, New Hampshire
Princeton University alumni
Harvard Fellows
Poets from Maine
Bowdoin College faculty
Writers from Brunswick, Maine
Gardiner family
20th-century American poets
20th-century American dramatists and playwrights
American male dramatists and playwrights
American male poets
20th-century American male writers
St. Paul's School (New Hampshire) alumni
People from Salem, Massachusetts